The Fayat Group is a  French and international construction and industrial company.

It is a family owned firm, founded in 1957 by Clément Fayat, and managed by his sons Jean-Claude Fayat and Laurent Fayat. It is structured in 7 fields of activity :

     Construction engineering
     Construction
     Energy Services
     Steel Construction
     Road Building Equipment
     Handling and hoisting equipment
     Pressure vessels

There are 205 subsidiaries in 120 countries, 21,505 employees, and 2020 revenue of Euro 4.1 billion Fayat is the largest independent construction group in France.

Acquisitions include: Dulevo, Dynapac, BOMAG.

One of Fayat's subsidiaries is working on the controversial Upper Yeywa dam project in Shan State, Myanmar (Burma). The dam is opposed by local residents and will result in displacement and environmental damage.

References

External links

Construction and civil engineering companies established in 1957
Multinational companies headquartered in France